The Italian Sailing Federation is the International Sailing Federation Member National Authority for Italy.

Notable sailors
See :Category:Italian sailors

Olympic sailing
See :Category:Olympic sailors of Italy

Offshore sailing
See :Category:Italian sailors (sport)

Yacht Clubs
See :Category:Yacht clubs in Italy

References

External links

Italy
Sailing
Yachting associations
Sailing governing bodies
1927 establishments in Italy